*R or R* denote hyperreal numbers.

R* may also refer to:

 R* rule (ecology), or resource-ratio hypothesis, a hypothesis in community ecology 
 Rockstar Games, an American video game publisher
 r* or r-star, natural rate of interest
 R*-tree, a tree data structure for spatial access
 Rstar, later called Okina, a sub-satellite of SELENE

See also
 Berkeley r-commands, to enable Unix users to issue commands to another Unix computer via TCP/IP computer network
 Carbon star
 Variable star